Mantidactylus radaka is a species of frog in the family Mantellidae. It is endemic to Madagascar. It was described in 2020 by an international team of scientists, who differentiated it from M. guttulatus and M. grandidieri via molecular data from wild and museum specimens.

The specific name is based on the Malagasy word for "large frog" (as opposed to sahona, "small frog"), which is often used as a common name for the species. It is frequently hunted and eaten by local people.

Its natural habitats are calm, shallow streams in rainforests. Its conservation status has not yet been evaluated by the IUCN.

References 

radaka
Endemic frogs of Madagascar
Amphibians described in 2020
Taxa named by Franco Andreone
Taxa named by Frank Glaw
Taxa named by Miguel Vences
Malagasy cuisine